S.S.C. Napoli performed about the same as it had in the 1993-94 season, finishing seventh in the championship, but having a better domestic cup run. Napoli also reached the Last 16 of the UEFA Cup, where it lost to Eintracht Frankfurt. The squad had been depleted due to losses of several offensive key players in the seasons before, so seventh in the domestic league would normally have been regarded as a positive result, but it was only after Vujadin Boškov had been appointed to lead the team in place of Vincenzo Guerini that Napoli could stay well clear of the relegation zone. Brazilian signing André Cruz was crucial to the defense, and also showed unusual offensive skills for a central defender, scoring several goals. Fabio Cannavaro also had a spectacular season, which ended with Parma buying the defender.

Squad

Transfers

Competitions

Serie A

League table

Results by round

Matches

Coppa Italia

Second round

Eightfinals

Quarterfinals

UEFA Cup

First round

Second round

Eightfinals

Statistics

Players statistics

References

Sources
  RSSSF - Italy 1994/95

S.S.C. Napoli seasons
Napoli